This is a list of schools in West Northamptonshire, a unitary authority in the English county of Northamptonshire.

State-funded schools

Primary schools

Abbey CE Academy, Daventry
The Abbey Primary School, Northampton
Abington Vale Primary School, Northampton
All Saints CE Primary School, Northampton
The Arbours Primary Academy, Northampton
Ashby Fields Primary School, Daventry
Ashton CE Primary School, Ashton
Badby School, Badby
Barby CE Primary School, Barby
Barry Primary School, Northampton
Blackthorn Primary School, Northampton
Blakesley CE Primary School, Blakesley
The Bliss Charity School, Nether Heyford
Blisworth Community Primary School, Blisworth
Boddington CE Primary School, Upper Boddington
Boothville Primary School, Northampton
Boughton Primary School, Boughton
Bracken Leas Primary School, Brackley
Brackley CE Junior School, Brackley
The Bramptons Primary School, Chapel Brampton
Braunston CE Primary School, Braunston
Briar Hill Primary School, Northampton
Bridgewater Primary School, Northampton
Brington Primary School, Little Brington
Brixworth CE Primary School, Brixworth
Buckton Fields Primary School, Northampton
Bugbrooke Community Primary School, Bugbrooke
Byfield School, Byfeild
Caroline Chisholm School, Northampton
Castle Academy, Northampton
Cedar Road Primary School, Northampton
Chacombe CE Primary Academy, Chacombe
Chiltern Primary School, Northampton
Chipping Warden Primary Academy, Chipping Warden
Clipston Endowed Primary School, Clipston
Cogenhoe Primary School, Cogenhoe
Collingtree CE Primary School, Collingtree
Cosgrove Village Primary School, Cosgrove
Crick Primary School, Crick
Croughton All Saints CE Primary School, Croughton
Culworth CE Primary Academy, Culworth
Danetre and Southbrook Learning Village, Daventry
Deanshanger Primary School, Deanshanger
Delapre Primary School, Northampton
Denton Primary School, Denton
Duston Eldean Primary School, Duston
The Duston School, Duston
Earl Spencer Primary School, Northampton
East Haddon CE Primary School, East Haddon
East Hunsbury Primary School, Northampton
Eastfield Academy, Northampton
Ecton Brook Primary School, Northampton
Falconer's Hill Academy, Daventry
Falconer's Hill Infant School, Daventry
Farthinghoe Primary School, Farthinghoe
Flore CE Primary School, Flore
Gayton CE Primary School, Gayton
The Good Shepard RC Primary School, Northampton
The Grange School, Daventry
Greatworth Primary School, Greatworth
Green Oaks Primary Academy, Northampton
Greens Norton CE Primary School, Greens Norton
Guilsborough CE Primary School, Guilsborough
Hackleton CE Primary School, Hackleton
Hardingstone Academy, Northampton
Harlestone Primary School, Lower Harlestone
Harpole Primary School, Harpole
Hartwell Primary School, Hartwell
Headlands Primary School, Northampton
Helmdon Primary School, Helmdon
Hopping Hill Primary School, Northampton
Hunsbury Park Primary School, Northampton
John Hellins Primary School, Potterspury
Kilsby CE Primary School, Kilsby
Kings Heath Primary Academy, Northampton
Kings Sutton Primary Academy, King's Sutton
Kingsley Primary School, Northampton
Kingsthorpe Grove Primary School, Northampton
Kingsthorpe Village Primary School, Kingsthorpe
Kislingbury Primary School, Kislingbury
Lings Primary School, Northampton
Little Houghton CE Primary, Little Houghton
Long Buckby Infant School, Long Buckby
Long Buckby Junior School, Long Buckby
Lumbertubs Primary School, Northampton
Lyncrest Primary School, Northampton
Maidwell Primary School, Maidwell
Malcolm Arnold Preparatory School, Northampton
Marie Weller Primary School, Towcester
Middleton Cheney Primary Academy, Middleton Cheney
Millway Primary School, Northampton
Milton Parochial Primary School, Milton Malsor
Monksmoor Park CE Primary School, Daventry
Moulton Primary School, Moulton
Naseby CE Primary Academy, Naseby
Newbottle and Charlton CE Primary School, Charlton
Newnham Primary School, Newnham
Nicholas Hawksmoor Primary School, Towcester
Northampton International Academy, Northampton
Old Stratford Primary School, Old Stratford
Overstone Primary School, Overstone
Parklands Primary School, Northampton
Pattishall CE Primary School, Astcote
Paulerspury CE Primary School, Paulerspury
Pineham Barns Primary School, Pineham Village
Pitsford Primary School, Pitsford
Preston Hedges Primary School, Northampton
Queen Eleanor Primary Academy, Northampton
The Radstone Primary School, Brackley
Rectory Farm Primary School, Northampton
Roade Primary School, Roade
Rothersthorpe CE Primary School, Rothersthorpe
St Andrew's CE Primary School, Northampton
St Gregory's RC Primary School, Northampton
St James CE Primary School, Northampton
St James Infant School, Daventry
St Loys CE Primary School, Weedon Lois
St Luke's CE Primary School, Northampton
St Mary's RC Primary School, Aston le Walls
St Mary's RC Primary School, Northampton
Silverstone CE Primary School, Silverstone
Simon de Senlis Primary School, Northampton
Southfield Primary School, Brackley
Spratton CE Primary School, Spratton
Spring Lane Primary School, Northampton
Standens Barn Primary School, Northampton
Staverton CE Primary School, Staverton
Stimpson Avenue Academy, Northampton
Stoke Bruerne CE Primary School, Stoke Bruerne
Sunnyside Primary Academy, Northampton
Syresham St James CE Primary School, Syresham
Thorpland Primary School, Northampton
Tiffield CE Primary School, Tiffield
Towcester CE Primary School, Towcester
Upton Meadows Primary School, Upton
Vernon Terrace Primary School, Northampton
Walgrave Primary School, Walgrave
Waynflete Infant's School, Brackley
Weedon Bec Primary School, Weedon Bec
Welford Sibbertoft and Sulby Endowed School, Welford
Welton CE Academy, Welton
West Haddon Endowed CE Primary School, Northampton
Weston Favell CE Primary School, Northampton
Whitehills Primary School, Northampton
Whittlebury CE Primary School, Towcester
Woodford Halse CE Primary Academy, Daventry
Woodland View Primary School, Northampton
Woodvale Primary Academy, Northampton
Wootton Park School, Northampton
Wootton Primary Academy, Wootton
Yardley Gobion CE Primary School, Yardley Gobion
Yardley Hastings Primary School, Yardley Hastings
Yelvertoft Primary School, Yelvertoft

Secondary schools

 Abbeyfield School, Northampton
 Campion School, Bugbrooke
 Caroline Chisholm School, Northampton
 Chenderit School, Middleton Cheney
 Danetre and Southbrook Learning Village, Daventry
 The Duston School, Duston
 Elizabeth Woodville School, Deanshanger and Roade
 Guilsborough Academy, Guilsborough
 Kingsthorpe College, Northampton
 Magdalen College School, Brackley
 Malcolm Arnold Academy, Northampton
 Moulton School and Science College, Moulton
 Northampton Academy, Northampton
 Northampton International Academy, Northampton
 Northampton School for Boys, Northampton
 Northampton School for Girls, Northampton
 The Parker E-ACT Academy, Daventry
 Silverstone University Technical College, Silverstone
 Sponne School, Towcester
 Thomas Becket Catholic School, Northampton
 Weston Favell Academy, Northampton
 Wootton Park School, Northampton

Special and alternative schools

 Billing Brook Special School, Northampton
 The CE Academy, Northampton
 Daventry Hill School, Daventry
 Fairfields School, Northampton
 The Gateway School, Tiffield
 Greenfields Specialist School for Communication, Northampton
 Hospital and Outreach Education, Northampton
 Kings Meadow School, Northampton
 Northgate School Arts College, Northampton
 Purple Oaks Academy, Northampton
 The Spires Academy, Northampton

Further education
 Moulton College
 Northampton College

Independent schools

Primary and preparatory schools
 Akeley Wood Junior School, Wicken
 Carrdus School, Overthorpe
 Maidwell Hall School, Maidwell
 OneSchool Global UK, Northampton
 Spratton Hall School, Spratton
 Winchester House School, Brackley

Senior and all-through schools
 Bosworth Independent College, Northampton
 Northampton High School, Hardingstone
 Overstone Park School, Overstone
 Pitsford School, Pitsford
 Quinton House School, Upton
 St Andrew's College, Northampton

Special and alternative schools
 Cambian Northampton School, Northampton
 Education & Youth Services, Northampton
 Include Northampton, Northampton
 On Track Education Centre Northants, Northampton
 On Track Education Silverstone, Silverstone
 Potterspury Lodge School, Towcester
 Progress Schools, Northampton

West Northamptonshire
Schools in West Northamptonshire District
Schools